Glenea masakii is a species of beetle in the family Cerambycidae. It was described by Hiroshi Makihara in 1978. It is known from Japan. It measures between

References

masakii
Beetles described in 1978